Terrai Bainem District is a district of Mila Province, Algeria.

The district is further divided into 3 municipalities:
Terrai Bainen
Amira Arras
Tessala Lemtai

Districts of Mila Province